Odile Slynn, Baroness Slynn of Hadley (born 1936 in Paris) (née Boutin) is a French-born British humanitarian, philanthropist and peeress, involved in several organisations advocating children's rights and wildlife preservation. She is the founder and chairman of the British branch of Child In Need India (CINI) and former chairman of the Society for the Protection of Animals Abroad (SPANA). She is the widow of Gordon Slynn, Baron Slynn of Hadley.

Life 
Born in Paris, she was educated at Sorbonne University before she moved to London in 1959, where she trained as a nurse at Hammersmith Hospital. She married Gordon Slynn in 1962. She taught French at the University of Buckingham from 1980 until 2000 and became an honorary graduate of the university in 2003. When her husband was appointed a law lord and conferred a life peerage in 1992, she became Baroness Slynn of Hadley.

Charity Work 
Odile Slynn has been involved with the Society for the Protection of Animals Abroad since 1979. During her time as chairman, she was instrumental in launching new branches in Jordan, Syria and Mali and a relaunch of Tunisia. She also serves as Non Executive Director of RISE Partnership Trust.

She was also a member of the Board of Visitors for HMP Grendon / Springhill 1981-97, member of the Parole Board (1988–1992) and chairman of its Awarding Committee from 1999. She has been Honorary Secretary to the British Moroccan Society since 1985.

References

Slynn of Hadley
French emigrants to the United Kingdom
English philanthropists
Living people
1936 births
University of Paris alumni
Spouses of life peers